Michael Devereaux (born April 10, 1963) is an American former Major League Baseball outfielder. He was drafted by the Los Angeles Dodgers in the fifth round of the  amateur draft and made his debut on September 2, 1987. Along with the Dodgers, Devereaux played for the Baltimore Orioles in two separate stints, and the Chicago White Sox, Atlanta Braves and Texas Rangers.

Early life
Devereaux was born in Casper, Wyoming. He went to Kelly Walsh High School in Casper. He played collegiately at Mesa Community College and Arizona State University, where he earned a Bachelor of Arts Degree in Finance.

Career highlights
Devereaux was acquired by the Orioles from the Dodgers for Mike Morgan on March 11, 1989. The peak of his career was from 1989 to 1993, with his best season coming in 1992 with the Orioles, when he played in 159 games, with 24 home runs, 107 RBIs and a .276 batting average. Devereaux won the 1995 NLCS MVP award with the Atlanta Braves by driving in the game-winning RBI in the 11th inning of Game One and hitting a three-run home run in Game Four against Cincinnati. The Braves went on to defeat the Cleveland Indians in the World Series.

On July 15, 1989, Devereaux hit a walk-off home run in an 11-9 win against the California Angels. The call was controversial, as the home run ball came extremely close to the foul pole. Angels manager Doug Rader argued the call with umpire Ken Kaiser the following day and was ejected prior to the start of the next game.

Devereaux played his final MLB game with his original team, the Dodgers, on April 17, 1998. In 12 seasons, he had a .254 batting average, and hit 105 home runs with 480 RBIs, three grand slams, 635 strikeouts, 85 stolen bases, and 29 errors. He is second in career home runs by a player born in Wyoming (only John Buck has more).

In March 2021, the Baltimore Orioles announced that Devereaux had been elected to the Orioles Hall of Fame. He was one of four inductees honored with an on-field ceremony prior to the Orioles game on August 7, 2021.

Post-playing career
Devereaux served as field coach for the Delmarva Shorebirds (Baltimore Orioles Class-A Affiliate, South Atlantic League) in 2010, replacing former third baseman Ryan Minor, who had been promoted to team manager. Devereaux was the field coach for the Frederick Keys (Baltimore Orioles Class-A Affiliate, Carolina League) in 2011. He was the hitting coach for the Asheville Tourists (Colorado Rockies Class-A affiliate, South Atlantic League) from the 2012 season through the 2016 season, after which in 2017 he was assigned to the Boise Hawks, the Rockies' affiliate in the short-season Class A Northwest League. For the 2018 season, he was the hitting coach for the Cincinnati Reds Double A affiliate, the Pensacola Blue Wahoos of the Southern League. Devereaux was the 2019 hitting coach with the single-A Dayton Dragons, a Reds affiliate.  Devereaux was working as a roving hitting, outfield, and base running coach at IMG Academy in Bradenton, Florida.

References

External links

, or Retrosheet, or Pelota Binaria (Venezuelan Winter League)

1963 births
Living people
African-American baseball players
Albuquerque Dukes players
Arizona State Sun Devils baseball players
Atlanta Braves players
Baltimore Orioles players
Baseball players from Wyoming
Bowie Baysox players
Chicago White Sox players
Frederick Keys players
Great Falls Dodgers players
Hagerstown Suns players
Las Vegas Stars (baseball) players
Los Angeles Dodgers players
Major League Baseball center fielders
Major League Baseball right fielders
National League Championship Series MVPs
Navegantes del Magallanes players
American expatriate baseball players in Venezuela
Sportspeople from Casper, Wyoming
San Antonio Dodgers players
Texas Rangers players
21st-century African-American people
20th-century African-American sportspeople
Mat-Su Miners players